Misozi Chisha Rachael Zulu (born 11 October 1994) is a Zambian footballer who plays as a midfielder for the Turkish Women's Super League club Hakkarigücü Spor and the Zambia women's national team.

Club career 
Zulu went to Kazakhstan by July 2019, and joined the Shymkent-based club BIIK Kazygurt on a six-month loan deal. She took part at the 2019–20 UEFA Women's Champions League for the Kazakhi team.

At club level she played for National Assembly F.C. and Green Buffaloes F.C. in Zambia.

By December 2021, she moved to Turkey and joined Hakkarigücü Spor to play in the 2021–22 Turkcell Super League.

International career 
She was a member and captain of the Zambia women's national football team. She was part of the team at the 2014 African Women's Championship.

References 

1994 births
Living people
Zambian women's footballers
Women's association football midfielders
Zambia women's international footballers
Zambian expatriate women's footballers
Zambian expatriate sportspeople in Kazakhstan
Expatriate women's footballers in Kazakhstan
National Assembly F.C. players
BIIK Kazygurt players
Green Buffaloes F.C. players
Zambian expatriate sportspeople in Turkey
Expatriate women's footballers in Turkey
Hakkarigücü Spor players
Turkish Women's Football Super League players